Byllion may refer to:
 1012 (long-scale billion) in Nicolas Chuquet's nomenclature, see Names of large numbers#Origins of the "standard dictionary numbers"
 1016 in Donald Knuth's -yllion nomenclature